The Papua New Guinean records in swimming are the fastest ever performances of swimmers representing Papua New Guinea. The records are recognised and ratified by the nations swimming federation: Papua New Guinea Swimming Inc. The records are for both long course (50m) and short course (25m) events.

The events include:
 freestyle: 50, 100, 200, 400, 800 and 1500;
 backstroke: 50, 100 and 200;
 breaststroke: 50, 100 and 200;
 butterfly: 50, 100 and 200;
 individual medley: 100 (25m pool only), 200 and 400;

All records were set in finals unless noted otherwise.

Long Course (50 m)

Men

Women

Mixed relay

Short Course (25 m)

Men

Women

Mixed relay

References

Papua New Guinea
Records
Swimming
Swimming